The following lists events that happened during 1944 in South Africa.

Incumbents
 Monarch: King George VI.
 Governor-General and High Commissioner for Southern Africa: Nicolaas Jacobus de Wet.
 Prime Minister: Jan Christiaan Smuts.
 Chief Justice: Ernest Frederick Watermeyer.

Events

 4 April – An Allied surveillance aircraft of 60 Squadron SAAF photographs part of Auschwitz concentration camp.

Births
 12 January – Eileen KaNkosi-Shandu, leader of the Inkatha Women Brigade.
 27 February – Graeme Pollock, former cricketer & cricket administrator
 3 March – Jerrold Kessel, South-African-born Israeli journalist and author. (d. 2011)
 9 March – Lee Irvine, cricketer
 23 June – Clive Barker (soccer), 1996 Africa Cup of Nations winning coach

Deaths
 19 September – Johannes Jacobus le Roux, Second World War fighter pilot, dies in an aircraft accident in France.

Railways
 The Namaqualand Railway line from Port Nolloth to O'okiep is closed.

Sports

References

History of South Africa